Bowen Dow Stassforth (August 7, 1926 – November 22, 2019) was an American competition swimmer who won a silver medal in the 200 m breaststroke at the 1952 Olympics and set two world records in the 200-yard (long course) breaststroke. and one world record in the 100 meter (long course) breaststroke

Biography
Born in Los Angeles on August 7, 1926, Stassforth was an eight-time All-American in swimming at the University of Iowa. At the conclusion of his career in 1952, he concurrently held 16 national breaststroke records in distances from 200 yards to 500 meters in 20 yard, short course and long course pools.  He was also the 1952 Iowa AAU Athlete of the Year and Iowa AAU's nominee for the James E. Sullivan Award.

In his early life, Bowen had an intense fear of water, which was the result of having his head put under water by his caretaker.  After his parents discovered this, swimming lessons commenced with several different instructors, all of whom were unsuccessful in helping him overcome his fear of water.  Finally, swimming lessons with Thelma Payne of the Los Angeles Athletic Club were able to help him overcome his fear of water.  His athletic career as a swimmer began at Los Angeles High School (1942–44) as well as the Hollywood Athletic Club during which time he finished second at the 1943 California State Meet in the 200 yard breaststroke to his teammate Harry Messenheimer.   In August 1944, while still in high school, Bowen enlisted in the U.S. Navy. His vision throughout his life was poor. Consequently, in order to join the Navy, he memorized the eye chart for his initial physical. During basic training, his vision problems were discovered by his superiors. As a result, he was subsequently assigned to teach swimming and water survival skills to enlisted sailors on North Island in San Diego. He was honorably discharged in 1946.

Bowen swam in the era when the accepted arm motion of the breaststroke was optional with either the contemporary underwater breaststroke or the over the water arm motion now known as the butterfly.  The leg movement was the frog kick.  In 1953, the stroke was bifurcated into the breaststroke and the butterfly using a dolphin kick.  As a result, any records he held were subsequently wiped off the record books.

At his first AAU National Outdoor Championship meet in 1945, representing Fleet Air Wing 14,  he placed second in the 200-meter breaststroke.  The next year in 1946, he placed sixth in both the AAU National Indoor and Outdoor Championship 220y/200M breaststroke behind Joe Verdeur, Charles Keating and his future coach, James Counsilman. He enrolled at the University of Iowa for the 1947-1948 school year and was coached by both David Armbruster and his assistant coach James Counsilman.  He was not allowed to compete as a freshman, however, due to conference eligibility rules at that time.  He did, however, participate in the U.S. Olympic Trials in July 1948 placing seventh in the 200-meter breaststroke with a time of 2:47.7. The following year, Bowen moved up the standings finishing third in the AAU Outdoor Championships 200 m breaststroke behind Keith Carter and Joe Verdeur the previous years' Olympic silver and gold medalists.

His first international competition came in 1950 as part of the American national swim team in several dual meets held in Japan.  This was the first time the American swim team had defeated Japan on Japanese soil. At the dual meet in Tokyo, Bowen set the world record in the 100 m breaststroke(long course) in 1:09.4 barely edging out his teammate Robert Brawner.>  Later that year, he was second in the National AAU Outdoor Championships in the 220 yard breaststroke to Robert Brawner.

In 1951, he won a bronze medal in the 200-meter breaststroke with a time of 2:47.6 and a gold in the medley relay at the 1951 Pan American Games in Buenos Aires. At the 1951 National AAU Outdoor Championships in the 200 m breaststroke, Bowen was second to John Davies but ahead of Robert Brawner, third and Jerry Holan, fourth.

After a fourth place finish behind John Davies, Jerry Holan, and Robert Brawner at the NCAA finals in 1952 in the 200 yard Breaststroke, his Big Ten rival and friend, John Davies tipped off Bowen that his training regimen needed to be improved with several adjustments.  As a result of these training adjustments, he qualified first overall at the 1952 US Olympic Trials beating both Brawner and Holan and breaking Joe Verdeur's American citizen record with a time of 2:36.0 in the 200 m breaststroke.

At the 1952 Summer Olympics in Helsinki, Finland, he qualified for the finals of the 200 m breaststroke.  While on the starting blocks of the finals, the cold air caused his muscles to tense up.  In order to counter act this, he purposely false started using the short time in the water to loosen back up.  Back up on the blocks, he was careful not to false start again. When the race was over, he placed second losing by 0.3 of a second to his Big Ten rival and friend John Davies of the University of Michigan who represented Australia.  His time of 2:34.7 set a new American record for the 200 m breaststroke (long course). Herbert Klein the world record holder in the 200 m breaststroke in both short and long courses was third.  Davies, Stassforth, and Klein were the only three swimmers to better 2:35 in history in the 200 m breaststroke (long course) prior to the bifurcation of the stroke in 1953.

He finished his career later that month as the National AAU Outdoor Champion and the American record holder in the 220-yard breaststroke (a distance 3 feet 9 inches longer than the Olympic final) with the same time of 2:34.7 as the Olympic final. After the race, Bowen remarked, "Up till now I never felt that I had done my best.  Now I'm satisfied.  That was it." Although this was the fastest (pre-1953 bifurcation of the breaststroke) 220 y breaststroke (long course) in history, it stood only as the American record since FINA only recognized the 200 y and 200 m distances for world record purposes.

Bowen was inducted into the University of Iowa Hall of Fame in 1996.  Charles Roeser, the chairman of the U.S. Olympic men’s swimming committee in a letter to his coach David Armbruster, called Bowen “one of the most cooperative athletes I have ever known in thirty years of teaching and coaching.”  He also called him “America’s greatest breaststroke champion, but more than that, a real American and gentleman whose conduct is a worthy example for others to follow.” He died at his home in Rancho Palos Verdes, California on November 22, 2019 at the age of 93.

Records

See also
 List of Olympic medalists in swimming (men)
 List of University of Iowa people
 Los Angeles High School Notable Alumni
 World record progression 200 metres breaststroke-See notes regarding records prior to 1953

Notes
Stassforth's time of 2:34.7 in the 220 yard breaststroke (long course) at the 1952 AAU Outdoor Nationals correlates to a time of 2:33 in the 200 meter breaststroke (long course).  This performance was the fastest all-time for the 220 yard breaststroke (long course) and would have been the fastest 200 meter breaststroke (long course) in history (pre-bifurcation of the breaststroke in 1953) as well if it had been dual timed.  This is evidenced by the dual distance timed race in the 1950 National AAU Indoor Championships  in the 220 yard breaststroke (short course) between Joe Verdeur and Robert Brawner. During the race, Verdeur broke the world record for 200 meters with a time of 2:28.3 (short course).  However, Brawner won the race with a time of 2:29.3 for the full 220 yards beating Verdeur who was second in 2:29.4. On July 10, 1952, Stassforth's coach,  David Armbruster, had predicted a time of 2:33 for him in the 200 meter breaststroke (long course): "In my opinion, Bowen is capable of about 2:33 and he certainly should be a strong contender for the Olympic title."

References

1926 births
2019 deaths
American male breaststroke swimmers
Iowa Hawkeyes men's swimmers
Olympic silver medalists for the United States in swimming
Pan American Games gold medalists for the United States
Pan American Games bronze medalists for the United States
Military personnel from California
Swimmers at the 1951 Pan American Games
Swimmers at the 1952 Summer Olympics
Medalists at the 1952 Summer Olympics
Pan American Games medalists in swimming
Swimmers from Los Angeles
Medalists at the 1951 Pan American Games